Brynjar is a given name. Notable people with the name include:

Brynjar Aa, often Brynjar Å, (born 1960), Norwegian dramatist
Brynjar Þór Björnsson (born 1988), Icelandic basketball player
Brynjar Guðmundsson (born 1989), alpine skier from Iceland
Brynjar Gunnarsson (born 1975), Icelandic former footballer
Brynjar Hoff (born 1940), Norwegian oboist
Brynjar Kristinsson (born 1988), Icelandic cross-country skier
Thorarinn Brynjar Kristjansson (born 1980), Icelandic professional football player
Brynjar Kvaran (born 1958), Icelandic former Olympic handball player
Brynjar Leifsson (born 1990), Icelandic musician
Brynjar Lia (born 1966), Norwegian historian, professor at the University of Oslo
Brynjar Meling (born 1967), Norwegian lawyer
Brynjar Níelsson (born 1960), Icelandic politician, member of the Althing
Brynjar Rasmussen (born 1977), Norwegian jazz musician (clarinet)

See also
Brnjare
Bryja
Bryn (disambiguation)